Project NIA is an American advocacy organization that supports youth in trouble with the law as well as those victimized by violence and crime, through community-based alternatives as opposed to formal legal proceedings. This project is aiming to end juvenile incarceration. NIA comes from a Swahili word for "with purpose". The organization was founded by Mariame Kaba.

Suspension stories
Suspension stories is an initiative resulting from the collaboration between the Project NIA and the Rogers Park Young Women's Action Team  that collect stories about students involved with unfair Suspension and Expulsion primarily through videos They have also filmed and gathered information from teachers and other school personnel

See also
Rogers Park Young Women's Action Team

References

External links

Organizations based in Chicago